The Sisters Adorers of the Royal Heart of Jesus Christ Sovereign Priest are a Roman Catholic society of apostolic life of pontifical right in communion with the Holy See of the Catholic Church. The society for women is associated with the Institute of Christ the King Sovereign Priest.

Foundation and growth
The society was founded in January 2001 as the female branch of the Institute of Christ the King, a traditionalist Catholic priestly institute celebrating the Traditional Latin Mass. Cardinal Ennio Antonelli, at that time the Archbishop of Florence, bestowed the religious habit upon the first three sisters in June 2004. One sister and three postulants were received the following year. The community numbered nine sisters and four postulants in 2007 and 13 sisters and one postulant in 2009. In 2017 the sisters numbered 42. In 2008 on the feast day of Our Lady of the Rosary (7 October) the community received the status of pontifical right from Pope Benedict XVI.

Presence

The community's mother house is situated in Gricigliano, part of the Metropolitan City of Florence, Italy, which is also the location of the seminary of the Institute of Christ the King, who serve the community offering Mass and other sacraments. Since the Sisters first moved into the building they have undertaken extensive works of renovation.

Since 2010 the community is established in Le Noirmont, Switzerland, in a house formerly utilized by the Fathers of the Blessed Sacrament.

In December 2013 the Sisters bought the German monastery Maria Engelport, a Marian shrine and a local pilgrimage site in Rhineland-Palatinate, until then inhabited by the Missionary Oblates of Mary Immaculate. The community established itself on site on January 1, 2014. As of August 2014, 14 sisters lived in the monastery.

Since 2017 the Sisters are also present in Preston, England. In 2019 a novitiate was opened in Naples. On May 19, 2019 the Institute of Christ the King announced that the community will establish its first house in the United States, in Wausau, Wisconsin. Autumn was mentioned as the approximate time of the foundation. The purchase of a former bed and breakfast, which will serve as the convent, was finalized on May 30. The property was blessed by Bishop William P. Callahan on November 1 of that year, and given the name 'The Nativity of Our Lady'.

Spirituality
The way of life of the Sisters is that of a non-cloistered contemplative. They have as the community's three patron saints St. Francis de Sales, St. Benedict and St. Thomas Aquinas. The community participates in Mass and the Divine Office using the Traditional Latin Rite. Their daily schedule includes classes on Gregorian chant, Latin, philosophy and theology. They are also involved in manual labor such as sewing, lace-making or caring for liturgical vestments.

Notes

References

External links
 Adoratrices du Cœur Royal de Jésus-Christ Souverain Prêtre – Official website of the order 
 Sisters Adorers of the Royal Heart of Jesus
 Kloster Maria Engelport – Official website of the Maria Engelport Convent 
 Fondation de nos sœurs en Suisse – Official website of the community's foundation in Le Noirmont, Switzerland 

Christian organizations established in 2004
Institute of Christ the King Sovereign Priest
Catholic female orders and societies
Catholic religious orders established in the 21st century
Traditionalist Catholic nuns and religious sisters